Walking with Dinosaurs − The Arena Spectacular was a live adaptation of the award-winning television series Walking with Dinosaurs. Like the TV series, The Arena Spectacular has to recreate dinosaurs to the point of the viewers accepting the creatures as real. Created by late renowned Artistic Director and Visionary - William ‘Bill’ May. The show played its last show on 22 December 2019 at the Taipei Arena.

Production
 
Walking with Dinosaurs − The Arena Spectacular was created by The Creature Technology Company. The production cost $20 million to stage and used puppetry, suits, and animatronics to create 16 Mesozoic era creatures representing 10 species. Each large dinosaur weighs several tons, and is operated by two "voodoo puppeteers" and a driver beneath the dinosaur who also monitors the hydraulics and batteries. The smaller dinosaurs (marked by an *) are suits operated by the person in it, each weighing from 20–30 kg (44-66 lbs). There are six puppeteers for these suits, which only have side views. The nine prehistoric creatures featured are:

Allosaurus
Ankylosaurus
Brachiosaurus (1 adult, 1 adolescent)
Liliensternus*
Ornithocheirus also appeared as an animatronic in earlier versions of the tour, before being replaced with a CGI video sequence
Plateosaurus (1 adult, 3 hatchlings)
Stegosaurus
Torosaurus (2x)
Tyrannosaurus (1 adult, 1 juvenile*)
Utahraptor (3x)*

There was also the carcass of an ornithopod and a video sequence about the Ornithocheirus. Some of the dinosaurs initially did not have feathers, but they were later added after new research showed dinosaurs possessed plumage. This also necessitated rewrites of the script, which were added to later iterations of the show as well as improvements in the animatronics, making them more responsive to puppeteers and giving them the ability to "eat" food and spray water vapor as "breath".

Tours
Walking with Dinosaurs − The Arena Spectacular originated in Australia in January 2007 (as Walking with Dinosaurs: The Live Experience), and toured North America in 2007–10, Europe in 2010, and returned to North America until 2011. It also toured Asia beginning in December 2010. In 2011 the show came to its final destination of its first tour, New Zealand. In 2012, the show toured the UK, Germany, Ireland, Norway, Sweden, Denmark, Finland, and the Netherlands.

Tour dates

Reception 
Elliot Wagland from Huffington Post UK called the show "an enchanting way to spend an afternoon", saying that it "stunned" his son into silence.

References

External links
Tour website

Dinosaurs in popular culture
Entertainment events
Walking with...